TEDxWellington is an independent TEDx event held annually in Wellington, New Zealand. Like other TEDx events, the event obtained a free license from TED to hold the conference, with organizers agreeing to follow certain principles. In 2017, TEDxWellington hosted 13 speakers and 1,000 delegates at the St. James Theatre on Courtenay Place, the main street of Wellington's entertainment district, opposite the Reading Cinema complex.

History

TEDxWellington was founded as an independent TEDx event by producer DK.

In 2017, TEDxWellington hosted 13 speakers and 1,000 delegates at the St. James Theatre on Courtenay Place, the main street of Wellington's entertainment district, opposite the Reading Cinema complex.

Events and speakers

2014

 Fraser Callaway and Oliver Ward
 Sophie Jerram
 Ryfe
 Laura Green
 Guy Ryan
 Gabe Davidson
 Dylan Coburn
 Dave Moskovitz
 Cassandra Treadwell
 Arcee
 Alan Schaaf
 Adam Ben-Dror

2016

 Sacha Copland
 Pamela Bell
 Michael Armstrong
 Laurinda Thomas
 Marie Fitzpatrick & Nic Murray
 Glenis Hiria Philip-Barbara
 Fiona King
 Dr. Shaun Holt
 Deborah Morris-Travers
 David Eccles
 Charles Babb
 Asher

2017

 Bop Murdoch, Jody Burrell and Sarah Tuck
 Clare Christian
 Irene Wakefield
 Jack Candlish
 Jason Long
 Jo Cribb
 John Cockrem
 Marjan van den Belt
 Melissa Marquez
 Nik Curry
 Phil Sage
 Rebecca Stewart
 Tuaine-Nurse Tamarua Robati

2018 
TedXWellington 2018 was a break year due to a number of significant factors (including venue unavailability, attendee numbers, and the sponsorship levels) that impacted plans.

See also
 Culture of New Zealand

References

External links 
 TEDxWellington

Organisations based in Wellington
Culture in Wellington
Wellington